Mullica may refer to:

Places
Mullica River, a river in southern New Jersey once known as the Little Egg Harbor River
Mullica Township, New Jersey, a township in Atlantic County
Mullica Hill, New Jersey, a census-designated place located within Harrison Township, Gloucester County

Person
Eric Pålsson Mullica, an early Finnish settler of New Jersey who is the source of the name of all of the geographic features and place names

See also